Störnstein is a municipality in the district of Neustadt an der Waldnaab in Bavaria, Germany.

Störnstein was also the name of a former Princely County in the Holy Roman Empire in the Bavarian Circle.

Mayors

The mayor is Markus Ludwig (SPD), re-elected in 2020. In 2014 he became the successor of Boris-Michael Damzog (SPD).

References

Neustadt an der Waldnaab (district)
Bavarian Circle